USS Limpkin may refer to the following ships of the United States Navy:

 , launched 5 April 1941 and placed out of service 15 April 1946
 , launched 22 May 1954 and struck 1 May 1976

United States Navy ship names